The Gloster Grebe was developed by the Gloster Aircraft Company from the Gloster Grouse (an experimental aircraft later developed as a trainer), and was the Royal Air Force's first post-First World War fighter aircraft, entering service in 1923.

Design
In 1923, Gloster modified a Gloster Sparrowhawk fighter trainer with new wings to test a layout proposed by chief designer Henry Folland, combining a thick, high-lift section upper wing and a thinner, medium-lift lower wing, with the intention of combining high lift for takeoff with low drag. After the Grouse demonstrated that the new layout was a success, the British Air Ministry placed an order for three prototype fighters based on the Grouse (and therefore derived ultimately from Folland's Nieuport Nighthawk fighter of 1919), but powered by a  Armstrong Siddeley Jaguar III radial engine, as the "Nighthawk (thick-winged)".

The first of the prototypes (Gloster built a fourth machine as a company-owned demonstrator), by now known as the Grebe I, flew during May 1923. The performance of these prototypes during testing at RAF Martlesham Heath was good, and the Air Ministry decided to order the type into production as the Grebe II, this having a  Jaguar IV engine.

Like the Sopwith Snipe it replaced, the Grebe was a single-seat, single-engined biplane of fabric-covered wood construction. The fuselage had ash longerons and spruce stringers joined to plywood formers, while the single-bay wings (which had a considerable overhang outboard of the struts), had fabric-covered spruce spars and ribs. Two synchronised .303 in (7.7 mm) Vickers machine guns were mounted on the fuselage top decking.

Service history
Grebes entered service with the RAF during October 1923 when a flight of 111 Squadron re-equipped with the new fighter.  The Grebe was popular in RAF service, being much faster than the Snipe that it replaced and was also very agile. One problem with the Grebe was that it suffered from wing flutter, owing to the large overhang outside the interplane struts, which led to all RAF aircraft being modified with additional Vee-struts supporting the outer upper wing. Another problem was the Jaguar engine, which was heavy and unreliable, being prone to catching fire.

A total of 133 Grebes were produced, including the four prototypes, 108 Grebe II single-seat fighters and 21 two-seat dual-control trainers. Grebes were retired from the RAF in 1929, replaced in part by the Gloster Gamecock, which was a developed Grebe, (Gloster fighter design, from Nighthawk to Gloster Gladiator was evolutionary).
 
Two Grebes were modified for suspension beneath the R33 airship on a 'trapeze' for "parasite" trials. The Grebe was developed into the Gloster Gamecock fighter, which also entered production for the RAF. A Grebe was given to New Zealand by Sir Henry Wigram and another two Grebes were acquired by the New Zealand Permanent Air Force, fore-runner of the Royal New Zealand Air Force, entering service in March 1928 and serving for more than ten years until the mid-1938. The two survivors were used as instructional airframes until destroyed in 1943–44.

Variants

Gloster Grouse Experimental aircraft.
Grebe Mk I Single-seat fighter prototype, 4 built.
Grebe Mk II Production single-seat fighter variant with a 400 hp Armstrong Siddeley Jaguar IV engine, oleo-type landing gear and other modifications, 129 built.
Grebe (Dual) Following a trial modification to Grebe II J7519 a small number of the Grebe II production aircraft were completed as two-seat training aircraft in 1925.

Operators

 New Zealand Permanent Air Force
 Pilot Training School
 Royal New Zealand Air Force two inherited from the NZPAF in 1938

 Royal Air Force
 No. 19 Squadron RAF
 No. 25 Squadron RAF
 No. 29 Squadron RAF
 No. 32 Squadron RAF
 No. 56 Squadron RAF
 No. 111 Squadron RAF

Specifications (Grebe Mk.II)

See also

References

Notes

Bibliography

 Goulding, James. Interceptor: RAF Single-Seat Multi-Gun Fighters. London: Ian Allan, 1986. .
 Green, William and Gordon Swanborough. "The Era-Ending Gamecock". Air Enthusiast, Twenty-one, April–July 1983. .
 James, Derek N. Gloster Aircraft since 1917. London: Putnam, 1971. .
 James, Derek. "Aeroplane Database. The Gloster Grebe". Aeroplane, August 2009, Vol 37 No 8. pp. 61–73. .
 Lumsden, Alec and Thetford, Owen. On Silver Wings: RAF Biplane Fighters Between the Wars. London: Osprey Aerospace, 1993. .
 Mason, Francis K. The British Fighter since 1912. Annapolis, Maryland, USA: Naval Institute Press, 1992. .
 Thetford, Owen. Aircraft of the Royal Air Force 1918-57. London:Putnam, First edition 1957.
 Thetford, Owen G. Aircraft of the Royal Air Force since 1918. London: Putnam, 6th edition, 1977. .
 Thetford, Owen. "On Silver Wings — Part 4". Aeroplane Monthly, January 1991, Vol 19 No 1. pp. 10–16. .

1920s British fighter aircraft
Gloster aircraft
Aircraft first flown in 1923
Single-engined tractor aircraft
Biplanes
Parasite aircraft